Guangxi Stadium is a multi-purpose stadium newly built in Nanning, Guangxi, China. It costs 1,000,000,000 RMB and completed in 2010. The stadium has a capacity of 60,000.

References 

Sports venues in Guangxi
Football venues in China
Multi-purpose stadiums in China